The Atlante (English: Atlas of mythology), is a French sailboat that was designed by Georges Auzepy-Brenneur and first built in 1965.

Production
The design was built by Chantier Mallard starting in 1965 and by Archambault Boats of Dangé-Saint-Romain, France, starting in 1967. Production ended in 1977, with 280 boats completed. Archambault, which had been founded in 1967, went out of business in 2015.

Design
The Atlante is a recreational keelboat, built predominantly of fibreglass, with wood trim. It has a masthead sloop rig. The hull has a spooned, raked stem; a raised, plum transom; an internally mounted spade-type rudder controlled by a tiller and a fixed fin keel. It displaces .

See also
List of sailing boat types

References

External links
Photo of an Atlante under sail
Photo of an Atlante docked

Keelboats
1960s sailboat type designs
Sailing yachts
Sailboat type designs by Georges Auzepy-Brenneur
Sailboat types built by Archambault Boats
Sailboat types built by Chantier Mallard